Alfred Law (18 December 1862 in Birmingham, England – 19 May 1919 in Handsworth, England) was an English cricketer who played first-class cricket for Warwickshire between 1894-1899 and umpire in 1908.

Cricket career
Law made his first-class debut in a County Championship match for Warwickshire against Nottinghamshire in May 1894. His top score of 89 was made in May 1895 for his county versus Yorkshire.

After his playing career had ended, Law umpired in 19 first-class matches in 1908.

References

1862 births
1919 deaths
Cricketers from Birmingham, West Midlands
English cricketers of 1890 to 1918
Warwickshire cricketers
English cricket umpires
English cricketers